Rosewood is an unincorporated community in Wayne County, North Carolina, United States, located at the intersection of NC 581 and Rosewood Road, 1 mile south of U.S. Route 70.

Education

The community contains an elementary(k-5), middle(6-8), and high(9-12) school.  Rosewood Middle is at the intersection of Rosewood Road and NC 581 S. in the original Rosewood School building.  Rosewood High School is adjacent to the middle school on Rosewood Road.  The elementary school is on the corner of Rosewood Road and Charlie Braswell Road.

Community

The community operates two volunteer fire departments, Rosewood and Oakland.  There are several churches of various denominations within Rosewood including Rosewood First Baptist, Rosewood Church of God, Pine Forest United Methodist Church, Barnes Chapel Church, and Westwood United Methodist Church.  There are several families who have been in the community for several generations and still remain active parts of the community.

Industry

In recent years the city of Goldsboro has satellite annexed areas nearby the community in order for several stores to move into the area including McDonald's, Domino's, Walmart, and Dollar Tree.  The main industry is still farming including hog and chicken houses as well as tobacco, corn, sweet potato, strawberry, cotton, and soybean farming.

Politics

Rosewood is a politically conservative community and represented by Republicans in the local and state legislators.  Steve Keen was elected to the Wayne County Commission representing the Rosewood and Grantham Communities in 2008.  Rosewood is represented by Efton Sager in the North Carolina House and David Rouzer in the North Carolina Senate, both of which were also elected in 2008.

Location

The community is bordered by Goldsboro to the east, Johnston County to the west, Grantham Community to the south and U.S. Route 70 to the north.

Transportation

Passenger

Air: Raleigh-Durham International Airport is the closest major airport with service to more than 45 domestic and international destinations. Wayne Executive Jetport is an airport located nearby, but is only used for general aviation. 
Interstate Highway: I-795 is the closest Interstate to Rosewood, which is located 3.5 miles east in Goldsboro. 
Rosewood is not served directly by passenger trains. The closest Amtrak station is located in Selma.
Bus: The area is served by Greyhound with a location in nearby Goldsboro.

Roads
The main highway near Rosewood is U.S. Route 70, just to the north.

References

Unincorporated communities in Wayne County, North Carolina
Unincorporated communities in North Carolina